Gladys Kingsbury (July 30, 1876  – November 10, 1958) was an American silent film actress and screenwriter mainly known for her role in Her Younger Sister (1914). She was married to Frank Cooley.

Filmography 

Ima Knutt Gets a Bite (Short) (1916) as Mrs. Banks - Ima's Mother-in-Law
Bubbles and the Barber (Short) (1916) as Mrs. Bubbles
Cooking His Goose (Short) (1916) as Mrs. Banks
The Laird o'Knees (Short) (1916) as Mrs. Bellegraham
To Be or Not to Be (Short) (1916) as Mrs. Frummerly
Billy Van Deusen's Shadow (Short) (1916)
A Deal in Diamonds (Short) (1915) as The Landlady
The Redemption of the Jasons (Short) (1915) as Mrs. Sniffins - the Village Gossip 
Little Chrysanthemum (Short) (1915) as Mrs. Leighton
The Stay-at-Homes (Short) (1915) as Mrs. Baldwin
The Face Most Fair (Short) (1915) as Nurse
The Doctor's Strategy (Short) (1915) as Mrs. Jones
The Haunting Memory (Short) (1915) as Marie
The Constable's Daughter (Short) (1915) as Mary Hicks - the Constable's Wife
The Happier Man (Short) (1915) as Mary Fuller - the Reporter
The Spirit of Giving (Short) (1915) as Mrs. Stearns
Brass Buttons (Short) (1914) as Mrs. McArthur - Mary's Mother
Her Younger Sister (Short) (1914) as Emma Lyons, his daughter
The Girl in Question (Short) (1914) as Maude Simpson - the Gossip
As a Man Thinketh (Short) (1914) as Mrs. William Jones
A Rude Awakening (Short) (1914) as Mary Bolton
Dad and the Girls (Short) (1914) as First Stenographer
The Legend of Black Rock (Short) (1914) as Mona Reaves
The Tale of a Tailor (Short) (1914) as Mrs. Lane - the Mother
Nancy's Husband (Short) (1914) as The Widow
Metamorphosis (Short) (1914) as Laura Burr, Frank's Sister
Her Heritage (Short) (1914) as Mrs. Warren
The Peacock Feather Fan (Short) (1914) as Widow Willing
The Girl Who Dared (Short) (1914) as Lill - Maggie's Sister

Writer 
Her Younger Sister (Short) (1914) story, as Mrs. Frank Cooley)

References

External links
 

American silent film actresses
20th-century American actresses
American women screenwriters
1876 births
1958 deaths
20th-century English actresses
20th-century American women writers
20th-century American screenwriters